Righteous indignation, also called righteous anger, in some Christian doctrines, is considered the only form of anger which is not sinful, e.g., when Jesus drove the money lenders out of the temple (Matthew 21).

Elements

"Righteous" means acting in accord with divine or moral law or free from guilt or sin. It may also refer to a morally right or justifiable decision or action or to an action which arises from an outraged sense of justice or morality. (See third paragraph below) "Indignation" is anger aroused by something unjust, mean, or unworthy. The Standard Dictionary describes indignation as a "feeling involving anger mingled with contempt or disgust".

Classical examples
Aristotle considered righteous indignation [nemesis] as one of the virtues of the mean: "Righteous Indignation is a mean between Envy and Spite....righteous indignation is distressed at instances of undeserved good fortune".
Juvenal claimed that moral indignation drove him to write satire.

Pop cultural examples
The anthropomorphic, fictional, animated/drawn character Bucky O'Hare is the captain of a space-faring frigate named "The Righteous Indignation".

In the Bible

New Testament commentary
In Scott's comment on Ephesians 4:26, "Be angry, and yet do not sin; do not let the sun go down on your anger", he notes that "...on many occasions, in the management of families, in reproving sin, and even in ordering their temporal concerns", anger is permitted of Christians. Nevertheless, Scott cautions that Christians should aim to "....be very circumspect and vigilant to restrain that dangerous passion within the bounds of reason, meekness, piety, and charity; not being angry without cause, or above cause, or in a proud, selfish, and peevish manner." Scott argues that Christians should not express anger in the "language of vehement indignation".

The Forerunner Commentary on Psalms 137:2 argues that these psalms are about the "bitterness of exile into which God forced Judah", purportedly with the goal of turning grief into zeal, so that the "anger can be used to scour away sin" by becoming "righteously indignant". In Richard T. Ritenbaugh's comments on Proverbs 15:18 in How to Survive Exile, he argues that it "is alright for us to be righteously indignant as long as we do not sin."

In  James McCosh's book Motive Powers, he notes that "We may be angry and sin not; but this disposition may become sinful, and this in the highest degree. It is so when it is excessive, when it is rage, and makes us lose control of ourselves. It is so, and may become a vice, when it leads us to wish evil to those who have offended us. It is resentment when it prompts us to meet and repay evil by evil. It is vengeance when it impels us to crush those who have injured us. It is vindictiveness when it is seeking out ingeniously and laboriously means and instruments to give pain to those who have thwarted us. Already sin has entered."

In Book of Exodus 4:14, God was indignant at Moses' work. Moses betrayed the faith of God and he disobeyed God's will. He ordered the people of God to go to fight the Pharaoh of Egypt. The people of God obeyed His commands, and they were gone forever. In Book of Exodus 22: 21-24, helpless people, strangers, widows, and orphans suffered persecution. God was indignant when he witnessed such cruel acts. In Book of Exodus 32:10, God was indignant when he learned that his people no longer believed and worshiped him, but turned to idolatry

New Testament commentary
Daniel Whitby argues that "Anger is not always sinful", in that it is found among non-sinners. For example, Jesus was "angry with the Pharisees for the hardness of their hearts; yet He had no desire to revenge this sin upon them, but had a great compassion for them".

Theological commentary
St. Thomas Aquinas, in the question on anger of his Summa Theologiae, quotes the Opus Imperfectum in Matthaeum, "he that is angry without cause, shall be in danger; but he that is angry with cause, shall not be in danger: for without anger, teaching will be useless, judgments unstable, crimes unchecked," and concludes saying that "to be angry is therefore not always an evil."

See also
Indignation
Resentment
Adrasteia
Swift's Epitaph

References

Emotions
Christian terminology
Moral psychology